Kepler Laveran de Lima Ferreira  (born 26 February 1983), known as Pepe, is a Brazilian-Portuguese professional footballer who plays as a centre-back and defensive-midfielder for Porto and the Portugal national team. He is regarded as one of the greatest defenders of his generation.

During his professional career, Pepe played for Marítimo, Porto, Real Madrid, and Beşiktaş, with individual and team success with the middle two clubs. He won three La Liga titles, three UEFA Champions League titles, two Copa del Rey titles and played 334 games for Real Madrid. He has also won four Primeira Liga titles and three Taça de Portugal titles with Porto.

Born and raised in Brazil, Pepe opted to play for the Portugal national team, and has earned 133 caps since his debut in 2007. He played at four FIFA World Cups and as many UEFA European Championships, and was part of the team that won Euro 2016, also reaching the semi-finals of Euro 2012. Pepe was man of the match in the Euro 2016 final.

Club career

Marítimo
Born in Maceió, Alagoas, Pepe was named Kepler Laveran by his father in honour to scientists Johannes Kepler and Charles Louis Alphonse Laveran. He started playing football with local Corinthians Alagoano. At age 18, alongside teammate Ezequias, he moved to Portugal to sign with Marítimo in Madeira, spending the vast majority of his first season with the B-team.

After being promoted to the main squad for the 2002–03 season, under Russian manager Anatoliy Byshovets, Pepe rarely missed a match, playing in several positions including defensive midfielder.

During the 2002–03 pre-season, Pepe was given permission to train with Sporting CP for two weeks, after which a deal could be negotiated for his transfer. However, neither club could agree on financial terms and the negotiations broke down, with the player returning and going on to help Marítimo finish sixth in the following campaign and qualify to the UEFA Cup, having contributed with 1 goal in 30 matches.

Porto

In May 2004, shortly before the club sealed a treble of the league, cup and UEFA Champions League, Pepe signed for Porto.

In his first season, with Spanish coach Víctor Fernández at the helm, Pepe was mostly used as a backup, playing under veterans Pedro Emanuel, Jorge Costa and utility defender Ricardo Costa. However, in the following year, under the guidance of Co Adriaanse, he had a breakthrough season, establishing himself as one of the best defenders in the domestic competition: the Dutchman often chose a 3–4–3 offensive system, with the player often pitched as the only natural stopper. Porto eventually won back-to-back leagues and the Taça de Portugal.

Real Madrid

2007–11 seasons
On 10 July 2007, Real Madrid signed Pepe to a five-year contract, paying Porto a €30 million transfer fee. On 15 March 2008, Pepe scored the only (own) goal in a 0–1 away loss against Deportivo La Coruña. Eight months later, he was involved in a fight during training with teammate Javier Balboa – the defender was nonetheless called up for Real's next match, whereas the winger was not. As Los Blancos were eventually crowned champions of La Liga, he delivered a Man of the match performance in a 1–0 win at the Camp Nou against Barcelona.

Pepe was constantly hampered by injuries throughout the 2008–09 campaign. On 21 April 2009, he was also involved in an incident with Getafe's Javier Casquero: with the score at 2–2 and only a few minutes to play, he brought down the midfielder in the penalty area, being subsequently sent off. He then kicked Casquero twice, once on his shin and once on his lower back. When being pulled away from Casquero, he also pushed his head into the turf and stamped on him several times. In the ensuing mêlée, he also struck another opposing player, Juan Ángel Albín, in the face and eventually received a ten-match ban, which effectively ended his season.

In the 2009–10 season, Pepe returned to claim his place back in the starting line-ups. On 4 October 2009, he scored his first goal in the league, against Sevilla at the Ramón Sánchez Pizjuán Stadium, heading home from a Guti free-kick in a 1–2 loss. However, on 12 December, during a match at Mestalla against Valencia (3–2 win), he landed awkwardly following an aerial challenge and was stretchered off the pitch in the dying minutes of the first half. Scans later showed that he ruptured his right knee's anterior cruciate ligament. He went on to miss the rest of the season, jeopardising his 2010 FIFA World Cup chances.

For 2010–11, Pepe was joined at Real Madrid by countrymen Ricardo Carvalho and manager José Mourinho, pairing up with Carvalho to form one of the most efficient defensive pairings in La Liga. On 2 October 2010, Diario AS published an article where the player was reportedly open to leave the club on a Bosman transfer. According to the newspaper, "[W]hen he signed for Real Madrid in 2007, he sacrificed a part of his salary to pay for his huge transfer fee – this made him one of the lowest earners at the club, making €1.8 million a year." Again, he missed several matches due to injury and, after exhausting negotiations, finally signed a new contract, renewing his link to the club until 2015.

Pepe spent the final stretch of the season appearing as a defensive midfielder as Real Madrid faced Barcelona four times in less than one month. On 27 April 2011, in the UEFA Champions League semi-final first leg, he was sent off for a controversial challenge on Barcelona defender Dani Alves in an eventual 0–2 home loss. However, Alves also came into strong criticism, with Real Madrid claiming the Brazilian fullback had exaggerated the incident. Additionally, sportspersons including Rio Ferdinand, Michael Owen and Rory McIlroy criticised Alves' actions. The next day, UEFA opened disciplinary cases against both clubs for a number of incidents during the match. The verdict was announced eight days later: the red card stood and Pepe therefore received a one-match ban from European competition, which he served by not playing in the 1–1 draw in the second leg at Camp Nou.

2011–17 seasons

On 12 July 2011, Pepe extended his contract with Real Madrid again, until the end of the 2015–16 season. In a match against Osasuna on 6 November, he scored the team's second goal in an eventual 7–1 home routing. In the first match of the Copa del Rey quarter-final against Barcelona on 18 January 2012, he stamped on the hand of Lionel Messi, who was on the ground after having been fouled. The incident drew strong criticism from the Spanish media, who also noted his coming-together with Cesc Fàbregas earlier in the 1–2 home defeat, but he insisted that the incident, which was not seen by the referee, was "unintentional". On 23 January, the Royal Spanish Football Federation cleared him of any wrongdoing.

On 21 March 2012, Pepe was involved in another serious incident: after a 1–1 away draw against Villarreal in which he was booked and Real Madrid finished with nine players, he confronted referee José Luis Paradas Romero in the locker room area, saying, "What a ripoff motherfucker." Two days later, he was suspended for two matches.

In the 2011–12 season, Pepe formed a formidable centre back partnership with Sergio Ramos. That campaign, he went on to make 29 appearances in La Liga and 45 appearances in all competitions as Real Madrid claimed their 32nd league title.

On 19 August 2012, in the league opener against Valencia, Pepe collided with Real Madrid goalkeeper Iker Casillas in the play that led to the visitors equalising the score 1–1 (the final result). He was subsequently taken to hospital for observation, being released the following day. Amid feuds with Mourinho, Pepe lost his starting place to Raphaël Varane throughout the season and would end up getting into a scuffle with Atlético Madrid manager Diego Simeone from the substitutes' bench in the 2013 Copa del Rey Final.

In the 2013–14 season, Pepe had a personal career high number of goals scored and appearances made for Real Madrid, making 11 appearances in their La Decima winning campaign in the 2013-14 UEFA Champions League. Carlo Ancelotti, the Real Madrid manager at the time, spoke of his importance saying, "We’re more assured with him. He gives us confidence, personality and he helps the other players; he is very important for them." In the 2015–16 season, Pepe made nine appearances in the UEFA Champions League and 31 appearances in all competitions. He started the match when the team won the Champions League final against Atlético Madrid in a penalty shoot-out at San Siro, Milan.

In his last year playing for Real Madrid, Pepe had an injury-riddled season, in which he made 13 appearances, when Madrid won their 33rd La Liga and the 2016–17 UEFA Champions League, defeating Juventus in the final at Principality Stadium, Cardiff.

Beşiktaş
Turkish Süper Lig side Beşiktaş announced the signing of Pepe on a free transfer from Real Madrid, on 4 July 2017. His contract was worth €9.5 million in total over the two-years, plus a €4,000 bonus for each match played. On 13 August, he scored his first goal in a 2–0 home win against Antalyaspor.

On 19 April 2018, in the second leg of the Turkish Cup against Fenerbahçe, he received his first red card for Beşiktaş after a tackle on Souza. The match was later abandoned, after the Beşiktaş coach was struck by an object thrown from the stands.

Pepe revoked his contract with Beşiktaş in a mutual agreement on 17 December 2018.

Return to Porto

On 8 January 2019, Pepe returned to Porto after over a decade, on a 2-year contract. A week later, he played his first game for Porto since 2007 in the 2018–19 Taça de Portugal quarter-finals, winning 2–1 away to Leixões. While his side ended the 2018–19 season as league runners-up on the final day and lost the cup final on penalties to Sporting, they won both tournaments in 2019–20.

Following Danilo Pereira's exit to Paris Saint-Germain, Pepe was appointed as club captain on 12 October 2020. The following month, he extended his contract to 2023.

International career

Naturalisation, Euro 2008 and 2010 World Cup

Pepe never represented his native Brazil in any youth category. However, according to the player's father, in 2006, he was contacted by head coach Dunga about a possible call-up which he declined, stating that once he obtained Portuguese citizenship, he would join its national team. He became naturalised in August 2007 and, on 30 August, was named in the Portugal squad for the first time in view of a UEFA Euro 2008 qualifier against Poland. An injury while training for his club prevented the debut for his adopted country, which would materialise almost four months later, in Portugal's last match in the tournament against Finland on 21 November, a 0–0 home draw.

In the tournament's final stages, Pepe played in all of the national side's matches, scoring once in a 2–0 win against Turkey on 7 June 2008. Portugal was eliminated in the quarter-finals by Germany.

During the 2010 FIFA World Cup qualifying campaign, Pepe was often used as a defensive midfielder by national coach Carlos Queiroz. After his serious knee injury while playing for Real Madrid, he was eventually selected for the national squad that participated in the finals in South Africa, appearing against Brazil in the group stage (0–0) and eventual champions Spain in the round of 16 (0–1 loss).

Euro 2012 and 2014 World Cup
Again a starter in Euro 2012 under manager Paulo Bento, Pepe opened the score in the second group game against Denmark, heading home after a João Moutinho corner kick in an eventual 3–2 win. He was later chosen by UEFA as man of the match and, in the semi-final, he was one of two Portugal players to score in a 2–4 penalty shootout defeat to eventual winners Spain.

In the 2014 World Cup, Pepe received a red card in the first half of Portugal's opening match against eventual champions Germany, for headbutting Thomas Müller late into the first half of an eventual 0–4 loss. At the time, Müller was sitting on the ground and Pepe walked back to Müller to headbutt him.

Euro 2016 Champion and 2017 Confederations Cup
Pepe was named man of the match in the Euro 2016 final, helping his team to keep a clean-sheet in a 1–0 extra-time victory over hosts France and win his nation's first ever international title. His performance in the final was particularly noted by Sky Sports and Football Paradise Juuso Kilpeläinen for being firm and disciplined.

On 2 July 2017, in the third-place match against Mexico at the 2017 FIFA Confederations Cup, Pepe scored an injury time equaliser to send the match into extra-time. Portugal eventually won the match 2–1 to capture the bronze medal.

2018 World Cup and Euro 2020
In Portugal's opening match against Spain during the 2018 World Cup, Pepe went down after a collision with Spain forward Diego Costa, who then took the ball into the penalty area before scoring. The goal was checked by the video assistant referee (VAR), who allowed the goal to stand. In Portugal's second match, Pepe went down after he was tapped on the back by Morocco's Medhi Benatia. In the BBC studio, former footballer Rio Ferdinand called Pepe's dive "embarrassing". Former striker Didier Drogba also expressed derision for Pepe, stating "he's been doing this quite a few times". Pepe scored in Portugal's 2–1 defeat against Uruguay in the last 16.

On 6 September 2018 in a friendly match against Croatia at the Estádio do Algarve, Pepe earned his 100th cap. He captained the side and headed an equaliser from Pizzi's cross to secure a 1–1 draw.

Due to Zlatan Ibrahimović's injury, 38-year-old Pepe was the oldest outfield player at the delayed UEFA Euro 2020 finals in June 2021. On 11 November that year, he was sent off in a goalless draw away to the Republic of Ireland in 2022 FIFA World Cup qualification.

2022 World Cup
In October 2022, he was named in Portugal's preliminary 55-man squad for the 2022 FIFA World Cup in Qatar, being included in the final 26-man squad for the tournament. He scored Portugal's second goal in a thrashing 6–1 win in the round of 16 match against Switzerland; by doing so, at 39 years and 283 days old, he became the second-oldest player to ever score in the tournament, behind Cameroonian striker Roger Milla, who was 42 years and 39 days old when he scored against Russia in the 1994 FIFA World Cup.

Style of play
A quick, aggressive, physically strong, and tenacious defender, Pepe is known for his work-rate and hard-tackling style of play; due to his height, he is also an aerial threat on set-pieces. While he usually plays as a centre-back, he has also been used as a defensive midfielder at international level. However, despite his defensive abilities, he has also drawn criticism in the media due to his tendency to pick up cards, as he has often shown violent or unsportsmanlike behaviour, which includes diving, and violent challenges on the pitch.

Personal life
Pepe is married to Ana Sofia Moreira, whom he met in Porto in 2007. Together, they have two daughters.

Career statistics

Club

International

Scores and results list Portugal's goal tally first.

Honours
Porto
Primeira Liga: 2005–06, 2006–07, 2019–20, 2021–22
Taça de Portugal: 2005–06, 2019–20, 2021–22
Taça da Liga: 2022–23
Supertaça Cândido de Oliveira: 2006, 2020, 2022
Intercontinental Cup: 2004

Real Madrid
La Liga: 2007–08, 2011–12, 2016–17
Copa del Rey: 2010–11, 2013–14
Supercopa de España: 2008, 2012
UEFA Champions League: 2013–14, 2015–16, 2016–17
UEFA Super Cup: 2014
FIFA Club World Cup: 2014, 2016

Portugal
UEFA European Championship: 2016
UEFA Nations League: 2018–19

Individual
UEFA European Championship Team of the Tournament: 2008, 2012, 2016
UEFA Euro 2016 Final: Man of the Match
UEFA Champions League Squad of the Season: 2013–14
ESM Team of the Season: 2013–14
CNID Best Portuguese Athlete Abroad: 2014
Goal's La Liga Team of the Season: 2010–11
Süper Lig Team of the Year: 2017–18
Süper Lig Defender of the Year: 2017–18
Primeira Liga Defender of the Month: September/October 2020
Primeira Liga Team of the Year: 2019–20, 2020–21, 2021–22 
Quinas de Ouro Awards – Best Portuguese Player Playing in Portugal: 2020
SJPF Player of the Month: April 2006

Orders
 Commander of the Order of Merit

See also 
 List of footballers with 100 or more UEFA Champions League appearances
 List of men's footballers with 100 or more international caps

References

External links

Profile at the FC Porto website

Pepe at Goal.com

1983 births
Living people
People from Maceió
Portuguese footballers
Portugal international footballers
Brazilian footballers
Brazilian emigrants to Portugal
Naturalised citizens of Portugal
Association football defenders
Association football utility players
Primeira Liga players
Segunda Divisão players
C.S. Marítimo players
FC Porto players
La Liga players
Real Madrid CF players
Süper Lig players
Beşiktaş J.K. footballers
UEFA Euro 2008 players
2010 FIFA World Cup players
UEFA Euro 2012 players
2014 FIFA World Cup players
UEFA Euro 2016 players
2017 FIFA Confederations Cup players
2018 FIFA World Cup players
UEFA Euro 2020 players
2022 FIFA World Cup players
Brazilian expatriate footballers
Expatriate footballers in Portugal
Expatriate footballers in Spain
Expatriate footballers in Turkey
UEFA European Championship-winning players
UEFA Nations League-winning players
UEFA Champions League winning players
Commanders of the Order of Merit (Portugal)
FIFA Century Club
Sportspeople from Alagoas